Felicity Waterman (born 11 October 1964) is an English actress known for her role as Vanessa Hunt during the final two seasons of the television drama series Knots Landing, and for her role as regular cast member Lt. Abigail Hawling on the syndicated television series Pensacola: Wings of Gold (1999–2000).

She has also appeared in other TV series such as Thunder in Paradise (as Megan Whitaker Spencer, 3 episodes 1994) Babylon 5 (as "Kelsey" in "Mind War", 1994), SeaQuest DSV, Ellen, Northern Exposure, Weird Science and La Femme Nikita, and in direct-to-video movies including Unlawful Passage, Lena's Holiday, and Miracle Beach.

Personal life
Waterman's father was in the British Army, her grandfather flew Spitfires during World War II.  Her mother teaches children with learning disabilities.

Waterman attended boarding school in Somerset, England. Waterman focused on athletics, but a back injury curtailed a promising career as a high jumper. Switching to a more academic course of study, she entered Oxford University, where she read Geography.  After graduating, she began modeling as a way to see the world and was eventually brought to Los Angeles by the prestigious Elite Agency.

Her first roles were bit parts in Side Out and Die Hard 2, playing a stewardess in both films. Her first film in a lead role was 1991's Lena's Holiday, in which she played an East German tourist in Los Angeles who gets caught up in a murder plot.

She currently resides in California, USA.

Filmography

Film

Television

References

External links
 

1960s births
Living people
English television actresses
English film actresses
Year of birth missing (living people)
Place of birth missing (living people)